Bulrush Lake is a lake in central Saskatchewan, Canada.  The lake is located in the rural municipality of Last Mountain Valley, north of the town of Imperial and between Saskatchewan Highway 2 and Last Mountain Lake.

See also
List of lakes of Saskatchewan

Lakes of Saskatchewan
Last Mountain Valley No. 250, Saskatchewan